The 2004 Delaware lieutenant gubernatorial election was held on November 2, 2004, coinciding with the Delaware gubernatorial election. Democratic nominee and incumbent Lieutenant Governor of Delaware John Carney was reelected lieutenant governor over Republican nominee James P. Ursomarso in a landslide.

Candidates

Democratic Party
John Carney Jr., Lieutenant Governor of Delaware

Republican Party
James P. Ursomarso

Independent Party of Delaware
Michael Robert Dore

Libertarian Party
John M. Reda

General election results

See also
 2004 Delaware gubernatorial election

References

2004
Delaware
Gubernatorial